Richard William Herbert Jones (1900–1965) commonly referred to as R. W. H. Jones, was the British architect responsible for the design of the Art Deco Saltdean Lido and the Grand Ocean Hotel in Saltdean, Sussex, England.

Building magazine is alleged to have described Saltdean Lido as "one of the really first-class designs of its type in the country". It was completed in July 1938.

Jones' Ocean Hotel in Saltdean opened in July 1938 and has been likened to a "modern ocean liner run aground".

In addition, he was responsible for the design of residential properties in Saltdean including:

Teynham House, Chichester Road East
Curzon House, Chichester Road East
Marine View, Marine Drive

References

External links

1900 births
1965 deaths
20th-century English architects
Architects from Sussex